Homewood at Martinsburg is a retirement community and census-designated place (CDP) in Blair County, Pennsylvania, United States. It was first listed as a CDP prior to the 2020 census.

The CDP is in southeastern Blair County, in the northwestern part of North Woodbury Township. It is bordered to the east by the borough of Martinsburg and to the north by the Spring Drive Mobile Home Park CDP.

Demographics

References

External links
Community website

Census-designated places in Blair County, Pennsylvania
Census-designated places in Pennsylvania